Ioxilan is a diagnostic contrast agent.  It is injected intravenously before taking X-ray images to increase arterial contrast in the final image. It was marketed in the US under the trade name Oxilan by Guerbet, L.L.C., but has been discontinued in 2017.

Mechanism of action
Ioxilan is an iodinated contrast agent.

References

Radiocontrast agents
Iodoarenes
Acetanilides
Polyols